Gerald Bird (17 January 1928 – 18 February 2002) was a Trinidad and Tobago sailor. He competed in the Flying Dutchman event at the 1960 Summer Olympics, representing the West Indies Federation.

References

External links
 

1928 births
2002 deaths
Trinidad and Tobago male sailors (sport)
Olympic sailors of the British West Indies
Sailors at the 1960 Summer Olympics – Flying Dutchman
Sportspeople from Kent
People from Minster, Swale